The Milwaukee County Sheriff's Office is the principal law enforcement agency that serves Milwaukee County, Wisconsin. It provides law enforcement services for the county's freeways, Milwaukee County Courthouse, the Milwaukee County Criminal Justice Facility, the county-owned Milwaukee Mitchell International Airport, and 156 Milwaukee County Parks system, including all of the Milwaukee County lakefront. At one time it was the largest sheriff's department in the state of Wisconsin, with about 750 deputy sheriffs. By 2015 the agency had reduced the number of sworn personnel to approximately 300. The reduction of sworn members was due to hiring correction officers and no longer needing deputies in the county jail.

The current sheriff (who is elected by the public as a partisan office) is Denita R. Ball, who was sworn on October 24, 2022. Ball was elected as a Democrat.

Bureaus and divisions

Administrative Services Bureau 
The Administrative Services Bureau contains the Open Records Division, Central Records Unit, Media Relations, Clerical Staff, Traffic Desk, Special Events, Training Academy, Community Relations Unit, and the Honor Guard.

Detention Services Bureau 
The Detention Services Bureau handles inmate health, transportation, food services, inmate housing, property, jail records, visiting, classification, central booking records and warrants.

Police Services Bureau 
The Police Services Bureau oversees the Airport Division, Courts Division, Patrol Division, Parks Unit, Civil Process Unit, Motor Units, Explosive Ordnance Disposal (EOD) Unit, Special Weapons and Tactics (SWAT), Bicycle Patrol and the Boat Patrol

Criminal Investigations Bureau 
The Criminal investigations Bureau Oversees the General Investigations Unit, Apprehension Unit, Background Investigations, Undercover Unit,  and the Law Enforcement Analyst Division.

MCSO Ranks 
1.Sheriff: (1)

2.Chief Deputy: also known as Undersheriff is the second in charge. An Undersheriff partners with the Sheriff to develop the short- and long-term goals of the county’s sheriff’s department. (1)

3.Inspector: oversight of a Bureau operations and budgeting. (3)

4.Captain: oversight of a Division operations and budgeting. (12)

5.Lieutenant: Shift Commander, plans, oversees, and coordinates the daily activities of a designated operational entity of the Sheriff's Office. (9)

6.Sergeant: present the first line of supervisors. They perform all the duties of a Deputy as well as supervise, coordinate, and guide Deputy and other department employees in their daily activities. (15)

7.Deputy Sheriff: works to protect a county’s property and citizens. They patrol highways and cities, investigating crimes and keeping records of different criminal instances. They also escort detainees from court proceedings and ensure the courtroom is peaceful and professional.

Deputy Sheriffs operate different communications devices, like radios and telephones to report and respond to emergency calls. They’ll also navigate the highway and county areas to ensure all drivers are following posted speed limits and adhering to other traffic laws. Many Deputy Sheriffs also serve court documents to individuals.

Fallen officers 
Since the establishment of the Milwaukee County Sheriff's Office, 12 officers have died in the line of duty. For 11 years, the Milwaukee County Law Enforcement Executives Association, in conjunction with the Milwaukee County Sheriff’s Office and the Milwaukee Police Department, has hosted the Greater Milwaukee Law Enforcement Memorial Ceremony annually in May. The event, which honors Milwaukee County law enforcement officers killed in the line of duty, is part of the National Law Enforcement Memorial Week.

Equipment
Weapons and other duty equipment

 Sig P320 9mm- standard issue pistol, replaced Glock Model 22 Gen 4 .40
 Colt AR-15- different variants are issued by the agency depending on unit. The Colt RO603 (M16a1) is used for normal patrol deputies. 
 Taser X7- Used by patrol deputies as well as corrections officers.

Vehicles:

 Chevrolet Tahoe- patrol SUV
 Dodge Charger- patrol car
 Ford Explorers- patrol SUV

See also 
 List of law enforcement agencies in Wisconsin

References

External links 
 Milwaukee County Sheriff's Office

Government of Milwaukee County, Wisconsin
Sheriffs' offices of Wisconsin